The Sri Lankan Armed Forces award medals and their associated ribbon bars in recognition of various levels of service,  personal accomplishments and commemorative events while a regular- or volunteer serviceperson is a member of the Sri Lanka Army, Sri Lanka Navy and the Sri Lanka Air Force.  Together with military badges, such awards are a means to outwardly display the highlights of a serviceperson's career.

Medals for gallantry

 Parama Weera Vibhushanaya (Order of Absolute Heroism)
 Weerodara Vibhushanaya (Order of Heroism)
 Weera Wickrama Vibhushanaya (Order of Heroic Valor)
 Rana Wickrama Padakkama (War Valor Medal)
 Rana Sura Padakkama (War Champion Medal)

Sri Lanka orders
 Vishista Seva Vibhushanaya (Distinguished Service Order)
 Karyakshama Seva Vibhushanaya (Efficient Service Order) (Sri Lanka Army Volunteer Force)
 Prashansaniya Seva Vibhushanaya (Commendable Service Order) (Sri Lanka Volunteer Naval Force)

Wound medals 
 Uththama Pooja Pranama Padakkama (Medal of Honour for Supreme Sacrifice)
 Desha Putra Sammanaya (Son of the Nation Award)

Medals for long service and good conduct
 Uttama Seva Padakkama (Eminent Service Medal)
 Sri Lanka Armed Services Long Service Medal 
 Karyakshama Seva Padakkama (Efficient Service Medal) (Sri Lanka Army Volunteer Force)
 Prashansaniya Seva Padakkama (Commendable Service Medal) (Sri Lanka Volunteer Naval Force)
 Videsha Seva Padakkama (Foreign Service Medal)

War service medals 

 Eastern Humanitarian Operations Medal
 Northern Humanitarian Operations Medal
 Purna Bhumi Padakkama
 North and East Operations Medal 
 Vadamarachchi Operation Medal 
 Riviresa Campaign Services Medal

Peacetime service medals 
 Sewabhimani Padakkama
 Sewa Padakkama

Commemorative medals
 Ceylon Armed Services Inauguration Medal - 1951
 Queen Elizabeth II Coronation Medal - 1953
 Republic of Sri Lanka Armed Services Medal - 1972
 Sri Lanka Army 25th Anniversary Medal - 1974
 Sri Lanka Navy 25th Anniversary Medal - 1975
 Sri Lanka Air Force 25th Anniversary Medal - 1976
 President's Inauguration Medal - 1978
 Sri Lanka Army Volunteer Force Centenary Medal - 1981 (Sri Lanka Army Volunteer Force)
 50th Independence Anniversary Commemoration Medal - 1998
 Sri Lanka Army 50th Anniversary Medal - 1999
 Sri Lanka Navy 50th Anniversary Medal - 2000
 Sri Lanka Air Force 50th Anniversary Medal - 2001

United Nations Service Medals 

The United Nations Medal for participation in UN peacekeeping operations: 
 United Nations Operation in the Congo (MONUC) - 1960
 United Nations Security Force in West New Guinea - October 1962 to April 1963
 United Nations India-Pakistan Observation Mission - 1965, 1966
 United Nations Military Observer Group in India and Pakistan
 United Nations Operation in Mozambique - 1992 to 1994
 United Nations Truce Supervision Organization
 United Nations Stabilization Mission in Haiti - since 2004
 United Nations Interim Force in Lebanon - since 2010
 United Nations Multidimensional Integrated Stabilization Mission in the Central African Republic (MINUSCA) - since 2014
 United Nations Mission in South Sudan - since 2015
 United Nations Multidimensional Integrated Stabilization Mission in Mali (MINUSMA) - since December 2017
 United Nations Mission for Justice Support in Haiti - since 2017
 United Nations Interim Security Force for Abyei (UNIFSA)
 United Nations Mission for the Referendum in Western Sahara (MINUSRO)

Former decorations and medals

Dominion of Ceylon (1949 - 1972)

From its formation in 1949, the Ceylon Armed Forces continued the use of British military decorations. This was discontinued in 1956 with a suspension of nominations for British honours; until Sri Lanka's republican constitution of 1972, the following awards were used:

 Officer of the Order of the British Empire (Military Division) (suspended in 1956)
 Member of the Order of the British Empire (Military Division) (suspended in 1956) 
 Efficiency Decoration (Ceylon) (1930 - 1972) 
 Efficiency Medal (Ceylon) (1930 - 1972)
 Decoration for Officers of the Royal Naval Volunteer Reserve (1938-1950) 
 Royal Naval Volunteer Reserve Long Service and Good Conduct Medal (1938-1950)
 Queen's Medal for Champion Shots in the Military Forces (1954-1966)
 Ceylon Armed Services Long Service Medal (1961 - 1972)
 General Service Medal (Malaya Clasp) (1949 to Ceylon Pioneers)

Colonial (pre-1948)
Imperial and local medals awarded for military service to the colony and empire.  

Capture of Ceylon Medal (1807)
Ceylon Medal (1818)
Volunteer Officers' Decoration (1892-1930)
Volunteer Long Service Medal for India and the Colonies (1892-1930)
Queen's South Africa Medal (1989-1900 for service with the British Imperial Forces)
King Edward VII Coronation Medal (1902)
King George V Coronation Medal (1911)
British War Medal (1914-1918 for service with the British Army) 
Victory Medal (1914-1918 for service with the British Army)
Ceylon Volunteer Service Medal (1914-1919)
King George V Silver Jubilee Medal (1935)
King George VI Coronation Medal (1937)
War Medal 1939–1945 (1939-1945)
Defence Medal (1939-1945)
Burma Star (1939-1945 for service with the British Army) 
Africa Star (1939-1945 for service with the Royal Army Service Corps)
1939-1945 Star (1939-1945 for service with the Royal Air Force)
Air Crew Europe Star (1939-1945 for service with the Royal Air Force)

Order of precedence 
The various decorations and medals are worn in the order stipulated for each service by its service commander.

Sri Lanka Army 
The order in which decorations and medals are to be worn have been defined in the Dress Regulation of the Sri Lanka Army:

Sri Lanka Navy

Sri Lanka Air Force

See also
Sri Lankan campaign medals
Awards and decorations of the Sri Lanka Police
Orders, decorations, and medals of Sri Lanka

Notes

References

External links

Sri Lanka Army Medals
Sri Lanka Navy Medals
Sri Lanka Air Force Medals

 
Sri Lanka and the Commonwealth of Nations